James Suppel (19 October 1914 – 9 March 1994) was an Australian cricketer. He played one first-class match for New South Wales in 1946/47.

See also
 List of New South Wales representative cricketers

References

External links
 

1914 births
1994 deaths
Australian cricketers
New South Wales cricketers